This is a list of notable parks in the City of Ottawa, Ontario, Canada. Some of the major parks in Gatineau, Quebec, which attract many people from Ottawa, are also included.

Major parks

Andrew Haydon Park
Brewer Park
Britannia Park
Confederation Park
Dow's Lake
Hog's Back Park
Lansdowne Park
Macdonald Gardens
Major's Hill Park
 Mooney's Bay Park
Nepean Creek Park
Rockcliffe Park
Strathcona Park
Vincent Massey Park
Wesley Clover Parks

By neighbourhood

Airport-Uplands
Whisteria Park
Windsor Park

Alta Vista
Alta Vista Mews Park 
Alta Vista Park
Applewood Park
Billings Park
Canterbury Park
Cunningham Park
Edge Hill Park
Faircrest Heights Park
Featherston Park
Hawthorne Park
John Murphy Park 
Kilborn Park
Lynda Lane Park
Orlando Park
Playfair Park
Reeves Park
Robert Andrew Russell Park
Sharel Park
Weston Park

Ashton
Ashton Park

Barrhaven
Albion Falls Park
Andy Moffitt Trail
Barcham Park 
Baroness Park
Barrhaven Park
Barrhaven Mews Park
Berry Glen Park
Bumett Park
Calaveras Park
Chapman Mills Park
Clarity Park
Clarke Fields Park
Cobble Hill Park
Cresthaven Park
Davidson Park
Daybreak Park
Drumlins Park
Dylan Way Park
Escarpment Park
Finchley Park
Flanders Park
Foot Guards Park
Fosterbrook Park
Fraser Fields Parkette
Freshwater Parkette 
Furness Park
Golflinks Park
Gospel Oak Park
Greenbank Park
Greenpointe Park
Grovehurst Park
Gus Este Park
Half Moon Bay Park
Half Moon Bay District Park
Harbour View Park
Harthill Way Linear Park
Hibiscus Park
Horace Park
Houlihan Park
Ken Ross Park
Kilbimie Park
Knowlton Park
Lamprey Park
Larkin Park
Leatherleaf Park
Malvern Park
Maralisa Park
McKenna Park
Minto Recreation Park - Barrhaven
Moloughney Park
Mowat Farm Park
Mulligan Park
Neill Nesbitt Park
North Harrow Park
Oldfield Park
Palmadeo Park
Pheasant Run Park 
Redpath Park
Regatta Park
River Run Park
Rodeo Park
Rosetta Park
South Nepean Park
Stinson Park
Stonebridge Trail
Stonecrest Park
Strandherd Park
Strandherd Ultimate Fields
Tierney Park
Totteridge Park
Tucana Park
Utman Park
Water Dragon Park
Watershield Park
Watters Woods
W.C. Levesque Fields
West Houlahan Park
Weybridge Park

Beacon Hill North
Eastvale Park
La Verendrye Park
Loyola Park
Marquis Park
Naskapi Ridge Park
Sheffort Sports Park
Ski Hill Park

Beacon Hill South
Acres Park
Appleford Park
Elmridge Park
Fairfield Park
Jasmine Park
Kinsmen Park
Lockwood Park
Ogilvie South Park
Ridge Park
Trillium Park

Bel-Air Heights
Agincourt Park
Ainsley Park
Navaho Park

Bells Corners
Arbeatha Park
Arnold Park
Ascot Park
Bell Arena Park
Dante Park
Donoghue Memorial Park
Entrance Park
Florizel Park
Forestview Park
George Wilson Park
Harwick Park
Lynwood Park
NCC Aubrey Moodie Park
Priam Way Park
Quinpool Park
Trevor Park
Westcliffe Park
Williams Park

Blackburn Hamlet 

 Agnes Purdy Park (formerly South Park)
Bearbrook Park and Pool
Blackburn Park
Bush Park
Centre Park
Gloucester Allotment Garden
Harold Diceman Park
Hornets Nest Soccer Park
Isaiah Scharfe Park
John Kemp Park
Joshua Bradley Park
Keystone Park
Michael Budd Park
Orient Park
Richard Dagg Park
Tauvette Park
Woodhill Park

Blossom Park
Aladdin Park
Athans Park
Baden Park
East Bridle Path Park
Emerald Woods Park
Fawn Meadow Park
North Sawmill Creek Park
Pine Grove Park
Russell Boyd Park
Sawmill Creek Park
Sieveright Park
South Sawmill Creek Park
Trappers Park
West Bridle Path Park

Carleton Heights
Carleton Heights Park

Carlington
Alexander Park
Bellevue Manor Park
Carlington Park
Harrold Place Park
Meadowvale Terrace Park
Raven Park

Carlsbad Springs
Harkness Park

Carp
Carp Memorial Hall
Diefenbunker Baseball Diamond
Doug Rivington Park
Hidden Lake Park
Huntley Community Centre
Huntley Curling Club
Jensen Court Park
Langstaff Drive Soccer Fields
Langstaff Park
W. Erskine Johnson Arena
West Carleton War Memorial

Centretown
Arlington Park
Dundonald Park
Golden Triangle Park
Jack Purcell Park
Lisgar Parkette
McNabb Park
Nepean Place
Minto Park
St. Luke's Park

Centretown West
Chaudière Park
Dalhousie South Park
McCann Park
Piazza Dante Park
Plouffe Park
Primrose Park

Civic Hospital
Ev Tremblay Park
Fairmont Park
Reid Park

Cyrville
Cummings Park
Ken Steele Park
Marchand Park
Ogilvie North Park

Downtown Ottawa
Bronson Park
Confederation Park
Garden of the Provinces and Territories
Marion Dewar Plaza

Eastway Gardens
Cecil Morrison Park

Ellwood
Frank J. Licari Park (formerly Ridgemont Park, renamed in 2010)
Ledbury Park
Walkley/Albion Park

Fitzroy Harbour
Bairds Park
Egbert Reitsma Parkette
Fitzroy Provincial Park
Open Space (91 & 95 Chats Rd)
Fitzroy Harbour Community Centre and Campbell Bicentennial Park
River Park

Galetta
Galetta Community Centre

The Glebe
Brown's Inlet Park
Capital Park
Central Park
Chamberlain Park
Commissioners Park
Glebe Memorial Park
Lansdowne Park
Lionel Britton Park
Patterson's Creek Park
Senator Eugene Forsey Park
Sylvia Holden Park

Greely
Andy Shields Park
Edge Hill Park
 Ridgemont Park

Heron Gate
Anne Lacombe Park
Fairlea Park
Heatherington Park
Heron-Walkley Park
Sandalwood Park

Heron Park
Brookfield Park
Bruce Timmermans Park
Heron Park
Kaladar Park

Hintonburg
Armstrong Park
Bayview Friendship Park
Hintonburg Park
McCormick Park
Parkdale Park
Stirling-Carruthers Park

Hunt Club Estate
Cahill Park
Paul Landry Park

Hunt Club Woods
McCarthy Park
Uplands Park

Kanata

Glen Cairn
Beaton Park
Clarence Maheral Park
Dog Bone Park
Glen Cairn Community Centre / Morrena Park
Gowrie Park 
Graham Ball Softball Diamond
Hope Cloutier Park
Jack Charron Arena
Kincardine Park (Westcreek 1)
Kristina Kiss Park
Nairn Park (Westcreek 2)
Parkland (58 Castle Glen Cres) 
Parkland (Trans Canada Trail) 
Ravine Park  
Rickey Place Park
Searbrooke Park

Katimavik-Hazeldean
Beaufort Park
Byrd Park
Cattail Creek Park
Davis Park
Dorey Park
Dunlop Park
Escarpment Park (Chimo) 
Gesner Court Park
Glen Cairn Reservoir (Forest)
Hayward Park
Hazeldean Woods Park (Tamblin Park) 
Hewitt Park
Irwin Gate Park
Kanata Leisure Centre and Wave Pool
Katimavik Woods
Katimavik Woods Park North
Larsen Park
McGibbon Park
Parkland (16 Curan St)
Parkland (21 Lombard Dr) 
Parkland (491 Pickford Dr) 
Pickford Park
Rowe Park
Sewell Park
Shearer Park 
Stonegate Park
Walter Baker Park
Watt's Creek Park
Young's Pond Park

Leslie Park
Brucelands Park
Leslie Park
Valleystream East Park

Lindenlea
Lindenlea Park

Lower Town
Besserer Park
Bingham Park
Bordeleau Park
Cathcart Park
Cumberland Park
Jules Morin Park
Linear Park
MacDonald Gardens Park
Majors Hill Park
Ottawa Rowing Club Park
Rose Park

Manotick
A.Y. Jackson Park
Centennial Park
Chris Bracken Park
David Bartlett Park
George McLean Park
Hilltop Park
Long Island Aquatic Club South River Drive Park
Long Island Road Park
Scharf Park
Van Vliet Park
West River Drive Park
Whitewood Avenue Park

Mechanicsville
Laroche Park

Metcalfe
Eldon Craig Park
Joe Rowan Park
Mckendry Park
Van Rens Park

New Edinburgh
New Edinburgh Park
Rideau Falls Park
Stanley Park

North Gower
Alfred Taylor Recreation Facility
Craighurst Drive Park
Edward Craig Park
Edward Kidd Parkette 
Farmstead Ridge Park
Ferguson Pratt Park
Four Corners Plaza
Horace Seabrook Park
Lenida Drive Park
Meadowbrook Park
Russvern Park

Old Ottawa East
Ballantyne Park
Brantwood Park
Montgomery Memorial Park
Robert F. Legget Park
Springhurst Park

Old Ottawa South
Anniversary Park
Brewer Park
Brighton Beach Park
Linda Thom Park
Osborne Park
Windsor Park

Orleans

Cardinal Creek
Cardinal Creek Community Park
Cassia Circle Park
Glandriel Park
Pine Vista Park
Valin Park #2

Fallingbrook
Apollo Crater Park
Caserta Park
Charlemagne Park
Des Pionniers Park
Fallingbrook Park
Frenette Park
Gardenway Park
Linda Dunn Park
Marcel Lalande Park
Princess Louise Park
Ray Friel Recreation Complex and Park
South Fallingbrook Community Centre and Park
Talcy Park
Varennes Park
Watters Park

Queenswood South
Cardinal Farms Park
Centennial Park
Kinsella Park
Mayfair Park
Yves Richer Park

Piperville
Ludger Landry Park

Qualicum-Graham Park
Mohawk Park
Nanaimo Park
Okanagan Park
Valleystream Tennis Club and Park

Rideauview
Rideauview Park

Riverside Park
Arnott Park
Ernie Calcutt Park
Fielding Park
Flannery Green
Geoff Wightman Park
Linton Park
Marble Park
Mooney's Bay Park
Otterson Park
Paget Park
Pauline Vanier Park
Stanstead Park

Riverview

Alda Burt Park
Balena Park
Coronation Park
Dale Park
Hutton Park
Rideau Veteran's Home Memorial Park
Riverview Park

Rothwell Heights
Birdland Park
Combermere Park
Kindle Court Park
Nivens Woods Park
Quarry Park

Sandy Hill
Annie Pootoogook Park (formerly Sandy Hill Park, re-named in 2021)
Besserer Park
Dutchy's Hole Park
Robinson Field
Sir Wilfrid Laurier Park
St Germain Park
Strathcona Park

Sarsfield
Yves Chénier Park

Sheffield Glen
Sheffield Glen Park

South Keys
R. George Pushman Park

Stittsville
Abbott-Iber Woodlot
Albert Argue Wood Park
Alexander Grove Park
Alfred McCoy Park
Amberway Park
Amberwood Pathway
Bandmaster Park
Banyon Park
Bell Park
Blackstone Park
Brigatine Park
Bryanstone Park
Bryanston Gate Park
Campobello Park
CARDELREC Recreation Complex
Coyote Run Park
Crantham Park
Crossing Bridge Park
Deer Run Park
Eaglehead Park
Fernbank Wetlands
Forest Creek Park
Fred Mill Creek Park
Fringewood Park
Healey's Heath Park
Hopetown Park
Howard A. Maguire Park
Joe Lewis Park
Johnswoods Street Linear Park
Kavanagh Green
Kemp Woodland
Kittiwake Park
Ladybird Park
Laumann Park
Maestro Park
Maloja Park
Mark Yakabuski Park
Mary Durling Park
Par-La-Ville Park
Paul Lindsay Park
Pine Bluff Park
Pioneer Plains Park
Poole Creek Park
Pretty Street Community Centre
Putney Woodland Park
Ralph Street Park
Rosehill Park
Rouncey Park
Rubicon Park
Slate Park
Stitt Street Park
Sugar Creek Park
Sunray Park
Sweetnam Park
Tempest Park
Timbermere Park
Traditions Park
Traditions Wootlot
Trustee M. Curry Park
Upcountry Park
Upper Poole Creek Wetland
Village Square Park
Westridge Park
William Bradley Park
W.J. Bell Rotary Peace Park
Wyldewood Park

Trend-Arlington
Arlington Woods Park
Burnford Park
George Brancato Park
Trend Park
Trend-Arington Park

Vanier
Carillon Park
Emond Park
Janeville Park
Julien Park
Kingsview Park
Kiwanis Park
Lawson Park
Marier Avenue Park
Nault Park
Optimiste Park
Richelieu Park
River Road Park, Riverain Parc
St. Laurent Park

Vars
Alcide Trudeau Park
Cassandra Park

Village Green
Alexander Dunn Park
Billy Bishop Park
Ed Hollyer Park
Robert Gray Park
Village Green Memorial Park

Wellington Village
Fisher Park
Parkdale Park

Westboro
Byron Tramway Park
Champlain Park
Clare Gardens Park
Hampton Park
Heather Crowe Park
Iona Park
Lion's Park
Mahoney Park
McKellar Park
Riverside Terrace Park
Roy Duncan Park
Tillbury Park 
Westboro Kiwanis Park

Gatineau
Gatineau Park
Jacques Cartier Park
Lac Beauchamp Park

Park-like
Capital Pathway
The Central Experimental Farm
Greenbelt
Parliament Hill's centre lawn

See also

List of attractions in Ottawa
List of designated heritage properties in Ottawa
List of National Historic Sites of Canada in Ottawa

References

External links

Ottawa parks
National Capital Commission - Capital Parks to Discover

Ottawa
 
Parks
Ottawa